Soledad López Jiménez (born 4 April 1992) is a Spanish female handball player for CBF Málaga Costa del Sol and the Spanish national team.

She participated at the 2018 European Women's Handball Championship.

References

External links

Living people
1992 births
Spanish female handball players
Sportspeople from Málaga
Handball players at the 2020 Summer Olympics
21st-century Spanish women